Burton Mound (also known as Syujtun or Syuxtun) is a California Historical Landmark located in Santa Barbara, California, in the United States. It is believed to be a former Native American village that was discovered in 1542 by Juan Rodríguez Cabrillo. Historically known as Syujtun, it was also visited and documented by Juan Crespí, Gaspar de Portolà, and eventually Don Luís Burton, the latter who purchased the property in 1860. The California Department of Parks and Recreation has acknowledged that Burton Mound has "yielded some of the most important archeological evidence found in California".

History

As of 1782, the area known as Burton Mound was "one of the largest Chumash villages on the South Coast." The village, then called Syujtun, or Syuxtun, was visited by Gaspar de Portolà around August 1769. Portolà's party stated that the village was the largest out of all they visited up to that point, and that at least 600 people lived there. A party member stated: "In no other place had we met natives so affectionate and good natured."

The entire village had disappeared by the early 1830s. By 1800, there were about 120 people living there. Most of the Chumash had died from Spanish introduced diseases or become "members" of Mission Santa Barbara. A large building was built on site, which stored hide made from cattle. The property was bought by Joseph John Chapman in 1833. He was a former employee of Hippolyte Bouchard. Chapman helped construct Mission San Gabriel Arcángel. In 1860, the property was purchased by Lewis T. Burton. Burton became a major figure in Santa Barbara, opening a series of businesses in the town, including a post office, general store, and orchards. He died in 1879.

In January 1903, the property became integrated into the Potter Hotel, a luxury hotel with 600 rooms. In April 1921, the hotel was destroyed in a fire. It was not rebuilt. At this time, the property became a curious factor for archaeologists. John P. Harrington was in charge of excavating the property on behalf of the Smithsonian Institution. He started the excavation in the spring of 1923 and over 2,500 objects were uncovered by the end of summer that year. The objects from that excavation reside in the National Museum of the American Indian.

Today

Today, the site is located near West Beach. It is located on Burton Drive. The property comprises commercial and residential businesses. On July 12, 1939 it was named a California Historical Landmark.

Further reading
Harrington, John P. "Exploration of the Burton mound at Santa Barbara, California". Issue 1 of Annual report of the Bureau of American Ethnology to the Secretary of the Smithsonian Institution. Washington: Smithsonian Institution Bureau of American Ethnology. 1928.

See also
 History of Santa Barbara, California
California Historical Landmarks in Santa Barbara County, California

References

Chumash
Archaeological sites in California
Buildings and structures in Santa Barbara, California
California Historical Landmarks
History of Santa Barbara County, California
Santa Barbara, California